Bullitt is a 1968 American dramatic thriller film starring Steve McQueen.

Bullitt may also refer to:

People 
 Alexander Scott Bullitt (1761–1816), Kentucky pioneer and statesman
 Cuthbert Bullitt (–1791), Virginia planter, lawyer, and politician; brother of Thomas
 Dorothy Bullitt (1892–1989), American radio and television entrepreneur
 John Christian Bullitt (1824–1902), prominent lawyer and civic figure in Philadelphia, Pennsylvania
 Joshua Fry Bullitt, Jr. (1856–1933), Virginia lawyer; son of Joshua Bullitt 
 Joshua Bullitt (1821–1898), Justice of the Kentucky Court of Appeals; father of Joshua Fry Bullitt, Jr.
 Kay Bullitt (1925–2021), American education reformer, civil rights activist and philanthropist
 Thomas Bullitt (1730–1778), American soldier and pioneer from Virginia; brother of Cuthbert
 William Christian Bullitt, Jr. (1891–1967), American diplomat, journalist, and novelist
 William Marshall Bullitt (1873–1957), American lawyer and author
 Jill Bullitt (b. 1951), American artist

Other uses 
 Bullitt (album), a 1969 album by saxophonist Wilton Felder
 Bullitt (soundtrack), the 1969 soundtrack album for the film
 Bullitt Center, in Seattle
 Bullitt County, Kentucky
 Bullitt Foundation, an American environmental organization
 Bullitt Group, a cell phone manufacturer
 Mustang Bullitt, a 2018 model of Ford Mustang cars

See also 
 Bullit (disambiguation)
 Bullet (disambiguation)